Dichomeris loxospila is a moth in the family Gelechiidae. It was described by Edward Meyrick in 1932. It is found in India, China (Zhejiang, Hong Kong) and Taiwan.

The wingspan is 12.5–15 mm. The forewings are pale greyish orange with a dark fuscous median patch near the middle of the cell and another small one at the end of the cell. The postmedian line is yellowish white.

References

Moths described in 1932
loxospila